Egham railway station serves the town of Egham in Surrey, England. The station is owned by Network Rail and managed by South Western Railway, which also provides the train services. The station is also served by trains to Weybridge.

The station signs read 'Egham, for Royal Holloway, University of London'. Many students from this college use the station for travel to and from Egham.

A new station building built by British Rail on the London-bound platform was opened in 1985 by Lady Lawrence.

Services
The typical Monday-Saturday off-peak service from the station is:

4 tph (trains per hour) to London Waterloo, of which two run via Richmond (limited stop) and two run via Brentford (all stations)
2 tph to Weybridge
2 tph to Reading

On Sundays this is reduced to:

3 tph to London Waterloo, of which two run via Richmond and one runs via Brentford
1 tph to Woking
2 tph to Reading

References

External links

Railway stations in Surrey
DfT Category C2 stations
Former London and South Western Railway stations
Railway stations in Great Britain opened in 1856
Railway stations served by South Western Railway
1856 establishments in England